The Tomahawk Conference is a Minnesota State High School League sanctioned athletic conference comprising schools located in the south central region of Minnesota.

Offerings

Sports
The conference offers the following:

The conference schools football teams play in either the Southern Minnesota Conference or Gopher Conference.  Teams in the Tomahawk Conference compete in competitive classes of A and AA for section and state tournaments.

Activities
The conference offers the following:

Current members
The conference consists of 10 schools, although Cedar Mountain High School and Comfrey High School have a co-op for all sports, leaving 9 teams to compete.

While a majority of schools in the conference are public, Minnesota Valley Lutheran, New Ulm Cathedral, and Sleepy Eye St. Mary's are private schools.

Former members
 McLeod West High School - closed spring 2009.

External links
  Tomahawk Conference

References

 http://www.tomahawkconference.org/g5-bin/client.cgi?G5genie=31

Minnesota high school sports conferences